Dutch Marich is an American director, screenwriter, and producer. He is best known for his work on the film Horror in the High Desert.

Life and career
Dutch was raised in Ruth, Nevada. His debut feature film, Bleed Out, starred Nichole Cordova. His second feature film, Hunting, premiered on September 30, 2019, on Amazon Prime Video. His recent films are Infernum (2019), Reaptown (2020)  and Horror in the High Desert (2021).

Filmography

As Actor
 2009 – Kicking Sand in Your Face
 2010 – Jelly
 2010 – Finer Feelings
 2011 – Bleed Out
 2016 – The Dark Hand

References

External links

Living people
Horror film directors
American film producers
American male film actors
American male screenwriters
20th-century American male actors
Year of birth missing (living people)